Shahrak-e Muk (also Romanized as Shahrak-e Mūk; also known as Mook and Mūk) is a village in Khvajehei Rural District, Meymand District, Firuzabad County, Fars Province, Iran. At the 2006 census, its population was 244, in 58 families.

References 

Populated places in Firuzabad County